Michel Orcel (born 1952, in Marseille) is a contemporary French writer, publisher and psychoanalyst.

Biography 
After studying classical literature at the Jesuits in Marseille, Michel Orcel graduated from the Institut d'études politiques de Paris (Public Service department., class 1974), he gave up his preparation studies to the ENA and moved to the Sorbonne: he obtained a master's degree in philosophy under the direction of Claude Tresmontant) and a DEA in Islamology under the direction of Roger Arnaldez, he finally defended a doctoral thesis in Literature and Human Sciences (Italian Studies, directed by Mario Fusco) and obtained in 1996 his authorization to direct doctoral research (University of Tours).

At the same time, he began a career as a literary journalist and music critic at VOGUE, Avant-Sène Opéra, etc.

Orcel was a researcher at the European University Institute at Florence in 1976–1977 (seminars of teachers Charles Wilson and Alphonse Dupront) and resident at the Académie de France à Rome. He was a lecturer at Rennes (1993–1997), where he founded a chair in the history of Italian opera.

After having animated for years, with Alain de Gourcuff, the magazine and the editions de L'Alphée, in 2015, he founded with Noël Dominguez, the ARCADES AMBO publishing house.

Psychoanalysis 
Trained in Paris and subsequently analysed by Jean-Pierre Maïdani Gérard (SPF, EPCI), Manuel Garcia Barroso (SPP), and Kathleen Kelley-Lainé (SPP), he practiced in Paris and Marrakech.

Essays 
An Italianist, Orcel gave essential essays on Leopardi and the dark side of Italian literature. (Italie obscure), as well as on Verdi, of whom he is the most recent French biographer. In the field of Islamology, in addition to his travel books, he published in 2011 De la dignité de l'islam. Réfutation de quelques thèses de la nouvelle islamophobie chrétienne ("On the dignity of Islam. Refuting some of the theories of the new Christian Islamophobia"). Although regretting that this essay is similar to a controversial "pamphlet", the critics nevertheless welcome a useful book that presents a nuanced reading of the Quran. This book was followed by a much more neutral essay: L'Invention de l'islam, which provides an update on the traceable origins of this religion. Michel Orcel is also working on the emblematic, and in 2016 published Volume I of an article on the subject: Dictionnaire raisonné des devises (in coll. with Alban Pérès, éditions ARCADES AMBO, 2017), which lists and illustrates nearly 2,700 mottos.

Literature 
As an author of fiction (poetry, novels), essays, encyclopedic works, translations, Orcel has received the following awards: "Diego Valeri" (Italy), "Nelly Sachs", and "Jules Janin" prizes of the Académie française as well as the "Ortensia" prize of the S.I.D.E.F (Società Italiana dei Francesisti). In 2015, Michel Orcel had a "museum-book" published. : Le Val de Sigale. Pays d'Esteron et de Chanan à travers six siècles d'histoire (ARCADES AMBO). In November 2016 he published La Destruction de Nice at Pierre Guillaume de Roux editions as well as a booklet of translations from various languages Ô nuit pour moi si claire at the Dogana (Geneva).

Trivia 
Michel Orcel is a member of the Scientific Committee of the "Rivista Internazionale di Studi Leopardiani" (RISL), member of the "Association des Traducteurs Littéraires de France" (ATLF), member of the "Société Française d'Héraldique et de Sigillographie" (SFHS) and founder of the journal Recherches romanes et comparées in 1997. He was promoted a Commander to the Order of the Star of Italy in 2009. A candidate in René Girard's chair at the Académie française during the election on 17 November 2016, Michel Orcel obtained 3 votes in the first round, against 3 for Gonzague Saint Bris and 11 for Daniel Rondeau. This election, which did not end up in a majority result, was considered "blank" and postponed to a later date. This second election did not yield any majority results.

Work

Poetry, essays, fiction, dictionaries 
 Le Théâtre des nues, L'Alphée, Paris, 1981
 Les Liens, L'Alphée, Paris, 1982
 Élégie, suivi de Parva domus, La Dogana, Geneva, 1984
 Destin, Le Temps qu'il fait, Cognac, 1987
 Langue mortelle, foreword by Jean Starobinski, L’Alphée, Paris, 1987
 Odor di femina, Le temps qu'il fait, Cognac, 1989
 N. N. ou L’amour caché, Grasset, Paris, 1989
 Trois guerriers plus un, Le temps qu’il fait, Cognac, 1993
 Le Sentiment du fer, Grasset, Paris, 1994
 Histoire d'une ascension, Le temps qu'il fait, Cognac, 1996
 Italie obscure, Librairie Belin, Paris, 2001
 Verdi. La vie, le mélodrame, Grasset, 2001
 Les Larmes du traducteur, Grasset, Paris, 2002
 Voyage dans l’Orient prochain, La Bibliothèque, Paris, 2004
 Napoléon Promenade, Ed. du Rocher, Paris, mai 2007
 Le Livre des devises, Le Seuil, Paris, 2009
 De la dignité de l'islam. Réfutation de quelques thèses de la nouvelle islamophobie chrétienne, Bayard, Paris, 2011; réédition ARCADES AMBO, Paris-Nice, 2015
 L'invention de l'islam. Enquête historique sur les origines, Perrin, Paris, 2012
 Jardin funeste, ARCADES AMBO, Paris-Nice, 2015.
 Le Val de Sigale. Pays d'Esteron et de Chanan à travers six siècles d'histoire, ARCADES AMBO éd., Paris-Nice, 2015.
 La Destruction de Nice, proses, Pierre-Guillaume de Roux éditeur, Paris, 2016.
 Dictionnaire raisonné des devises (volume I), in collaboration with Alban Pérès, ARCADES AMBO éd., Nice, 2017.

Main translations 
 Dix Petites Pièces philosophiques by Leopardi, Le Temps qu'il fait, Cognac, 1985 (2nd edition 1991; 3rd edition 2009).
 Poèmes et fragments by Leopardi, La Dogana, Geneva, 1987
 Poésies by Michelangelo, Imprimerie Nationale, Paris, 1993
 Trois Livrets pour Mozart by Da Ponte, foreword by J. Starobinski, Flammarion GF, Paris, 1994
 Chants / Canti by Leopardi, Flammarion, Paris, 1995 (reissued GF, 2005)
 Roland furieux by Ludovico Ariosto, Éditions du Seuil, Paris, 2000
 Jérusalem libérée by Torquato Tasso, Gallimard Folio, Paris, 2002
 Rimes et plaintes Tasso, Fayard, Paris, 2002
 Les Confessions d'un Italien by Ippolito Nievo, Fayard, Paris, 2006
 Sourates et fragments du Coran, La Bibliothèque, Paris, 2009
 Le Messager by Tasso, Verdier, Paris, 2012
 La Beffa di Buccari (Un pied de nez aux Autrichiens) by Gabriele d'Annunzio, La Bibliothèque, Paris, 2014
 Copernic (dialogue) by Leopardi, ARCADES AMBO, Paris-Nice, 2015
 Ô nuit pour moi si claire, booklet of translation (from Properce to Shelley), La Dogana, Geneva, 2016

Bibliography 
 "Michel Orcel" in Dictionnaire de poésie de Baudelaire à nos jours, PUF, Paris, 2001
 J.-P. Richard, Terrains de lecture, Éditions Gallimard, Paris, 1996
 J. Schwarz,  Le Passage ou l'itinéraire d'un passeur en métamorphose dans "Les Larmes du traducteur" de Michel Orcel et "La Route de San Giovanni" d'Italo Calvino, mémoire de maîtrise, Paris III, June 2003.
 B. Simeone, Une splendide errance, in La Quinzaine littéraire, No 769, 1630 November 2000
 B. Simeone, Verdi pessimiste et secret, in Tageblatt-Bücher/Livres, Luxembourg, 16 February 2001

References

External links 
 Personal website
 
 
 
 

Writers from Marseille
1952 births
Living people
21st-century French writers
20th-century French poets
French psychoanalysts
French scholars of Islam
20th-century French musicologists
Italian–French translators
Sciences Po alumni